Singaporean National Badminton Championships is an annual badminton tournament held in Singapore since 1961.

History 

In 1961, Singapore Badminton Association (SBA) started a local championships to find talents to represent Singapore in regional and international competitions after the previous championships became an open invitation championships in 1957.

Past winners

Most successful players 
Below is the list of the most successful players ever in the competition:

Below is the list of the most successful player(s) in each discipline (listed according to their last title):

MS: Men's singles; WS: Women's singles; MD: Men's doubles; WD: Women's doubles; XD: Mixed doubles

References 

Badminton tournaments in Singapore
National badminton championships
Sports competitions in Singapore
Recurring sporting events established in 1961